Châu Thành is a rural district (huyện) of Đồng Tháp province in the Mekong Delta region of Vietnam. As of 2003 the district had a population of 161,413. The district covers an area of 234 km2. The district capital lies at Cái Tàu Hạ.

Divisions
The district is divided into the following communes:

Cái Tàu Hạ
An Hiệp
An Khánh
An Nhơn
An Phú Thuận
Hòa Tân
Phú Hựu
Phú Long
Tân Bình
Tân Nhuận Đông
Tân Phú
Tân Phú Trung

References

Districts of Đồng Tháp province